Gyan, (also known as Gyan Dairy), is an Indian dairy products company, headquartered in Lucknow Uttar Pradesh, India and is known for the processing and distribution of dairy products produced in regionally located facilities. Gyan Dairy manufactures, markets and sells a full line of dairy products such as Milk, Lassi, Curd, Butter, and Ghee. Its tagline "always fresh, always pure" was unveiled in 2017, along with the company's theme song 'Shuddh aur taaza, Gyan ka waada'.

Gyan Dairy is a privately held subsidiary of C.P. Milk and Food Products and was founded by Chandra Prakash Agarwal in 2007. Since its inception, Gyan Dairy has been led by brothers and joint managing directors, Jai Agarwal and Anuj Agarwal.

History 
In 2005, Mr CP Agarwal, who was leading Shriram Tobacco Company acquired a small press unit along with its brand name "Gyan". This small dairy unit was refurbished to create Gyan Dairy. A subsidiary of C.P. Milk and Food Products, Gyan Dairy was founded in 2007 after a cooperative system of dairy farming was set up by the company in the villages of Eastern Uttar Pradesh. Since its inception, Gyan Dairy which is headquartered in Lucknow, is jointly managed by C.P. Agarwal's grandsons Jai and Anuj Agarwal.

Products 
Gyan Dairy started with just two products on its portfolio – Gyan Skimmed Milk Powder and Gyan Desi Ghee. Gyan Dairy has since grown and now manufactures and sells 17 different milk and milk-based products,

Farmers 
When Gyan Dairy was founded, there was a scarcity of milk in Eastern Uttar Pradesh. Before the company began manufacturing, they created a cooperative system of dairy farming, starting with their home district of Farrukhabad. A team was set up for expanding their village base, and Gyan Dairy has since grown significantly. The cooperative system encourages farmers to take up dairy farming.

Gyan Diary has 2200 village level collection centers, and collects about a million liters of milk every day from 100,000 farmers spread across 6 districts in Uttar Pradesh and districts adjoining Lucknow.

Achievements 

 Gyan Dairy has received ISO 22000-2005 certified company.
 Jai and Anuj Agarwal, the joint managing directors of Gyan Dairy, have received the Young Indian Entrepreneur of the year awards in the year 2016.

Partnerships 
Gyan Dairy was the official dairy partner for the UP Yoddha which is UP's official kabaddi team for the VIVO PKL 2017 tournament.

References

External links
 Official website

Dairy products companies of India
Indian brands
Indian companies established in 2007
Dairy farming in India
Food processing industry in India